The Spir Mountain Cairns (Swedish: Spirbergsrösena) are two well preserved Bronze Age cairns in Ångermanland, Norrland, Sweden, built as graves and burial monuments, with burial cists interred. The ancient site is located at the top of the mountain Spirberget by Lake Mosjön in the Grundsunda parish, north of Örnsköldsvik at the High Coast in Ångermanland. The name Spirbergsrösena (English: The Spir Mountain Cairns) was  introduced by archaeologist Carl L. Thunberg as a formal name concept for the site in 2014 before a public lecture on behalf of the Swedish National Heritage Board, in connection with that year's Swedish national "Archaeology Day".

References 

Bronze Age
Ångermanland
Archaeology of Sweden
Archaeological cultures in Sweden

 
Prehistoric Scandinavia
 
Archaeological cultures of Northern Europe
Bronze Age cultures of Europe
Germanic archaeological artifacts
 
Northern Europe
Northern Europe
Prehistoric
Scandinavia